The Wistaria Tea House, the Wisteria House, or Wistaria House is a historical teahouse in Daan District, Taipei, Taiwan. The establishment is situated in a Japanese-style wooden house built in the 1920s on Xinsheng South Road. The teahouse is named after the three wisteria vines planted in the front courtyard forming a shaded area leading to the entrance of the building. The teahouse, with its circa 1930s decor, was reopened to much fanfare after a long needed renovation in 2008.

The teahouse was used during the filming of Eat Drink Man Woman.

History
The house served as a residence for the Governor-General of Taiwan under Japanese rule prior to 1945 and became government dormitories under the Republic of China administration in 1950. The building became a teahouse and gained its present name in 1981 and was meeting place for political dissidents such as Lei Chen (雷震) fighting for a democratic Taiwan during the 1980s. Since then, Wisteria House has been and continues to be a favored meeting place for Taipei literati, artists, and academics. It has since been designated as a historic monument by the Taipei government in 1997 and operation of the teahouse was turned over to the Wistaria Cultural Association by the Taipei City Cultural Bureau.

Gallery

References

External links

Wisteria House website
Events concerning the fate of the Wisteria House in ~1997
 Wisteria House — Traditional teahouse 紫藤廬 古蹟茶館 90年人文風

1981 establishments in Taiwan
Buildings and structures in Taipei
Tea houses
Tourist attractions in Taipei